This article covers the radio landscape in Flanders and Brussels, the Dutch-speaking region of Belgium known as the Flemish Community.

FM radio

The early years 
The legal framework for FM radio was introduced in 1930 when the Belgian government granted itself the state monopoly on radio broadcasting. By the law of June 18, 1930, the bilingual state broadcaster Nationaal Instituut voor de Radio Omroep (NIR) was founded. Broadcasts were initiated on February 1, 1931. Later, the state broadcaster would be split into a Dutch-language broadcaster (currently known as VRT) and a French-language broadcaster (currently known as RTBF).

Public radio 
In its current form, Flanders' public broadcaster is funded by a combination of taxpayer money and advertising. The following VRT stations broadcast over FM radio, covering pretty much the entire Flemish community:
 Radio 1: news, sports and current affairs
 Radio 2: soft AC with optouts for regional programming per province
 Klara: classical music
 MNM: contemporary hit radio
 Studio Brussel: modern rock, pop, indie & dance music 
All FM stations from the VRT except Klara broadcast commercials. In addition, the VRT also has some digital radio stations that are broadcast online and over DAB. The line-up has changed over the years, but every station is automated and commercial-free. Current lineup:
 MNM Hits: a non-stop version of MNM
 Ketnet Radio: a hit radio station targeting children
 VRT Nieuws: a non-stop loop of the latest Radio 1 news bulletin, updated every hour

Private radio 
For decades, private entities weren't legally allowed to operate radio stations in Flanders. Today, three types of radio stations are recognized by the Flemish broadcasting regulator: national, regional, local and other.

National broadcasters 
The following radio stations currently have "national" coverage status, meaning their coverage area spans the entire Flemish Community.

The frequencies for Nostalgie were originally zoned for regional use. In March 2008, Antwerpen 1, Radio Go, Radio Mango and Radio Contact Vlaanderen jointly started broadcasting Nostalgie on their frequencies. On March 8, 2010 the station took over some of the frequencies of EXQI FM in Limburg. This effectively created a new national broadcaster.

Local broadcasters 
Despite a significant amount of locally zoned FM frequencies, many local broadcast organizations choose to work together to form a network. Such franchises are known as ketenradio's (or "chain" radio stations). The individual frequencies of a radio network usually broadcast exactly the same output, save for localized commercials and the occasional mandatory regional news bulletin. Examples of networked radio stations include:
 Family Radio (Dutch music; no relation to the religious radio network)
 Hit FM
 Radio FG
 Radio Maria (catholic radio)
 TOPradio (dance)
 VBRO (Dutch music)
Independent local stations also exist, but aren't as widespread. Examples include:
 Radio Centraal (Antwerp)
 Radio Scorpio (Leuven)

References 

Dutch-language radio stations in Belgium
Radio in Belgium